The list of ship launches in 1780 includes a chronological list of some ships launched in 1780.


References

1780
Ship launches